Dinengdeng (also called inabraw) is a dish of the Ilocano people of the Philippines, similar to pinakbet. It is classified as a bagoong monamon soup based dish. Unlike pinakbet, dinengdeng contains fewer vegetables and contains squash and more bagoong monamon soup base.

The dish may contain the following vegetables: saluyot (jute) leaves, the pods and leaves of the marunggay(horseradish), the leaves and fruits of parya (bitter melon), the (calabaza) squash and blossoms, alukon blossoms, kalunay (amaranth) leaves, sweet potato tubers and leaves, gourds (like kabatiti and tabungaw), string beans and shoots, talinum, chayote shoots, chili peppers, sabunganay (banana blossoms), corn, West-Indian pea blossoms, tangkoy (winter melon), eggplant, okra, winged beans, parda beans (chicharo), lima beans, various mushrooms like oyster mushrooms, whole taro, cassava tubers, purple yams, and wild potatoes.

Some add fried or roasted fish or other meats, usually leftovers, to the dish.

See also
Sinabawang gulay
Binagoongan

References

External links
 Dinengdeng, glorious dinengdeng! - an essay about dinengdeng and samples of various dinengdeng.
 Pinakbet Republic - foodblog that "demystifies Ilokano food" and features "rave and rants on food and cuisine of the Ilokanos"

Ilocano cuisine
Philippine soups